The 2018 King Cup, or The Custodian of the Two Holy Mosques Cup, was the 43rd edition of the King Cup since its establishment in 1957, and the 11th under the current format. It started on 3 January and concluded with the final on 12 May 2018. The winner qualified for the 2019 AFC Champions League group stage.

Al-Ittihad won their eighth title after a 3–1 win over Al-Faisaly in the final on 12 May 2018.

Pro League side Al-Hilal were the defending champions, but they were eliminated by Al-Qadsiah in the Round of 16.  It was the earliest exit by the title holders since the introduction of the new format.

Participating teams
A total of 32 teams participated in this season. 14 teams from the Professional league, 16 teams from the First Division, and 2 teams qualifying from the preliminary stage.

Bracket

Note:     H: Home team, A: Away team

Source: SAFF

Round of 32
The Round of 32 matches were played between 3 and 7 January 2018. All times are local, AST (UTC+3).

Round of 16
The Round of 16 matches were played between 19 and 25 January 2018. All times are local, AST (UTC+3).

Quarter-finals
The Quarter-finals matches were played between 22 and 25 February 2018. All times are local, AST (UTC+3).

Semi-finals
The Semi-finals matches were be played on 30 and 31 March 2018. All times are local, AST (UTC+3).

Final

The final was held on 12 May 2018. All times are local, AST (UTC+3).

Top goalscorers
As of 12 May 2018

Note: Players and teams marked in bold are still active in the competition.

See also
 2017–18 Saudi Professional League
 2017–18 Prince Mohammad bin Salman League
 2017–18 Crown Prince Cup

References

2018
King Cup
Saudi Arabia